Jing Tian (born 21 July 1988) is a Chinese actress. She graduated from the Beijing Dance Academy and Beijing Film Academy. She is known for her roles in the war epic The Warring States (2011) and the action films Special ID and Police Story 2013 (both in 2013). She has had prominent roles in three Legendary Pictures films, The Great Wall (2016), Kong: Skull Island (2017), and Pacific Rim Uprising (2018).
She is also known for her roles in the historical dramas Legend of Ban Shu (2015), The Glory of Tang Dynasty (2017) and fantasy suspense drama Rattan (2021).

Career
Jing made her acting debut in the 2008 film Anaconda Frightened. Her first television series was the period  drama  The Epic of a Woman. In 2009, she was cast as the lead role in the historical drama Biography of Sun Tsu, which aired in 2013.

In 2010, Jing gained attention for her performance in the romance comedy drama My Belle Boss. In 2011, she rose to fame for her role in the historical war film  The Warring States. A few leading roles in high-profile films followed; such as action films Special ID and Police Story 2013 (both in 2013) and gambling film From Vegas to Macau (2014).

In 2015, Jing starred in the historical romance drama Legend of Ban Shu, playing the title role alongside Zhang Zhehan. The same year, she played the eponymous role in the historical fiction drama The Legend of Xiao Zhuang. In 2016, Jing starred as the female lead in Zhang Yimou's war epic film The Great Wall. Due to the recognition, Jing was cast in the Hollywood films Kong: Skull Island (2017) and Pacific Rim Uprising (2018).

In 2017, Jing starred in the historical fiction drama The Glory of Tang Dynasty alongside Ren Jialun, playing the role of Shen Zhenzhu. The drama was a hit and Jing gained positive reviews for her acting. Jing starred alongside Chen Bolin in the 2018 fantasy drama The King of Blaze, based on the manga series of the same name. In 2019, Jing starred in the road-trip romance drama  Love Journey alongside Chen Xiao. In 2021, she played the titular role of Si Teng in hit fantasy suspense drama Rattan. In 2022, Jing Tian was fined the equivalent of US$1.1 million for promoting Infinite Free candy as a weight loss product.

Filmography

Film

Television series

Television show

Music video

Discography

Albums

Singles

Awards and nominations
Jing Tian is the only Hollywood International Award winner in Hollywood Film Awards history. According to the press release, she won the inaugural award because her "performances have ignited the box office in her native land", and the award "was established to recognise cinematic talent from around the world and will be given every year", but the award was discontinued the following year.

Jing Tian has also been nominated for "Most Disappointing Actress" at the Golden Broom Awards (China's equivalent of Golden Raspberry Awards) three times, winning twice.

Forbes China Celebrity 100

References

External links
 
Jing Tian on Instagram

1989 births
Living people
Actresses from Xi'an
Actresses from Shaanxi
21st-century Chinese actresses
Chinese film actresses
Chinese television actresses
Beijing Film Academy alumni